Temple Israel is the Jewish Reform Congregation of Ottawa. The community is dedicated to Torah, Tzedakah and Avodah. Temple Israel is the second largest congregation in Ottawa, with approximately 340 families. Temple Israel provides outreach to unaffiliated Jews, many social justice activities, interfaith dialogue between the congregation and Christians and Muslims, and supports a strong and vibrant supplementary religious school and youth group.

History
The Jewish population of Ottawa grew from 20 families in 1889 to approximately 5,500 in 1961. Temple Israel Congregation, which was the first reform congregation in Ottawa, was founded by Bill and Billy Danson, Myrna and Ernie Potechin, Irwin and Elaine Singer, Sam and Jean Bond, along with Madelyn Alexandor in the spring of 1966. By November 1966, the membership consisted of seventeen families. Tenets of the Union of American Hebrew Congregations are followed. In March, 1967 the name Temple Israel was chosen. The first consecration service was held on October 28, 1967 at the Histadrut Centre. Later consecration services were held at the Montefiore Club with occasional large services at the Château Laurier or El Mirador Hotel. From September, 1971-October 1972, the congregation had its first permanent home in the former B’nai Jacob Synagogue on 54 James Street. The building, which had been renovated by Temple Israel, was badly damaged by fire in 1972. Services were held from 1972-1975 in the Montefiore Club, the Jewish Community Centre, 151 Chapel Street and the Unitarian Congregation. In 1975, Temple Israel held their High Holiday services in a newly designed synagogue building on Prince of Wales Drive. Rabbi David Powell served the congregation from the summer of 1967 until June 1972, and was followed by Rabbi Donald Gerber 1972-1980.  Rabbi Irwin A. Tanenbaum served the congregation for 8 years, from August, 1986 until July, 1994, as membership reached and exceeded 300 families. Rabbi Steven Garten became rabbi emeritus in 2014 after having served as Temple Israel's spiritual leader 19 years from 1995 -June 2014 and overseeing the direction and curriculum of the Temple Israel Religious school since 2007. Nearly 220 congregants have traveled to Israel on missions guided by Rabbi Garten. From 2014-2015, Norman Klein served as interim rabbi while a search was undertaken for a permanent rabbi. Rabbi S. Robert Morais was installed as permanent rabbi on Nov. 14, 2015.

Programming
The regular services at Temple Israel include Thursday morning minyanim and Shabbat and Erev Shabbat service, Torah study classes and conversion classes, festival celebrations, and High Holiday services. There are child friendly Friday Night Services, Bring your dinner Friday Night Services, Shabbat Services, Not your Zaide's Minyan, and Tot Shabbat for preschoolers and parents; The adult education includes: Books and Bagels, Tannach Study, Temple Israel Liberal Judaism Library, and Insight into Judaism course. Since the Reform movement is the leading voice for social justice in Israel, the social action at Temple Israel includes The Baby-Quilt-to-Israel Project, and ARZA Canada. Temple Israel has long-term relationships with homeless shelters, and non-Jewish social justice projects and aboriginal communities. For Africa, Temple Israel raised $15,000 for mosquito nets, and $13,000 for solar cookers. The musical programming at Temple Israel includes concerts and recitals. The liturgical choir chants Torah or Haftorah, the blessings, and leads Shiva or Havdalah services.

Inclusivity
Temple Israel conducts interfaith marriages and has a component of interfaith couples in the congregation, ensuring a Jewish education for their children. Temple Israel welcomes alternative Jewish families, such as gay and lesbian ones, transgender ones, and interracial couples, as well as singles.

Temple Israel Liberal Judaism Library
The Liberal Judaism Library is a volunteer library run on the honour system which includes a reference collection, adult fiction and non-fiction collections, a children’s collection and the books published by Union of American Hebrew Congregations (UAHC) and Central Conference of American Rabbis (CCAR).

Temple Israel Religious School (TIRS)
Temple Israel Religious School is the only Synagogue-affiliated supplemental school in Ottawa. TIRS offers programming for more than 86 students from Junior Kindergarten through Bar/Bat Mitzvah, to high school and confirmation. On April 21, 2011 the Temple Israel Board of Directors voted unanimously to open our Temple Religious School to non members of Temple Israel (Ottawa).  Sheli Braun served as principal of TIRS until 2015 when Sue Potechin took over as principal and Mitchell Leitman and Len Mandel serve as co-chairs of the Education Committee. TIRS offers Nursery and Kindergarten offers programs for 4-5 year olds on Sunday mornings which include weekly Hebrew language instruction; music; and study of holidays and basic blessings.  The children in grades one through six attend a program on Sunday mornings which includes a study of Torah, Israel, Tefilah (prayer), Holidays, Hebrew and Music. Beginning in Grade 2 and by Grade 3 (compulsory), students attend Wednesday afternoons for additional Hebrew studies. The grade 7 year class prepare for Bar Mitzvah/Bat Mitzvah once a week on Monday evenings and engage in the study of history and Jewish Life Cycle Events and 3 Sunday programs during the school year related to Life Cycle and Tzedakah. The combined grade 8 and 9 class study values and ethics, Judaic practice, modern Jewish history, current issues and events, Jewish literature and the arts, and social responsibility. The grade 10 Confirmation year class prepare for the Service of Confirmation on Shavuot and the adding of the silver links to the Chain of Tradition in our Sanctuary through weekly meeting to study theology and philosophy, discuss important issues of the day for Jewish Value content, and explore ritual and custom relating to Jewish lifecycle and a volunteer project of the student’s choice.

TempleCares
TempleCares is a project of Temple Israel, providing trained volunteer visitor support to clients of the Ottawa Jewish Community who are in Palliative Care due to a life-limiting illness.  The project is opening for client intake in December 2017.  Volunteers are Jewish adults who complete a training program at Temple Israel.

Camp George
Union for Reform Judaism (URJ) Camp George is a Reform Jewish immersive summer camp at 45 Good Fellowship Road, Seguin, Ontario. The camp for children ranging in age from 7-16, which was founded in 1999, includes programming such as Jewish education, the Arts, a Waterfront program, a Ropes Challenge Course, and athletic facilities.

Jewish Memorial Gardens
As of 1 July 2008, each of the Founding Members: Congregation Machzikei Hadas; Congregation Beth Shalom; Agudath Israel (Ottawa); the Jewish Reform Congregation of Ottawa – Temple Israel (Ottawa); Young Israel of Ottawa; Congregation Beit Tikvah of Ottawa transferred to Jewish Memorial Gardens the cemetery lands that they had.

References

Jews and Judaism in Ottawa
Synagogues in Ottawa
Buildings and structures in Ottawa
Reform synagogues in Canada